

Kings of France

Peers of France 
Note: Ecclesiastical peers must have had the title for at least five years to be listed here to avoid clutter. If there is not a peer listed for a certain number of years under 5 it does necessarily mean that the position was vacant.

Archbishops

Dukes

Marquises

Counts

Bishops 
Note: The bishops in bold are marked for their notability, land holdings, and because they had metropolitan powers.

Viscounts/Vidames 
Viscounts under the king of France or a domestic vassal.

Of Toulouse - Until Alphonse, Count of Poitiers became Count of Toulouse in 1249, the County of Toulouse was a powerful vassal of France which was almost independent of France. Within this large county (which also consisted of the duchy of Narbonne and the March of Provence) there were at least 11 viscounts who were vassals of the counts, one of the rare cases where the term viscount makes sense intuitively in the 13th century. However with the Albigensian Crusade many of the viscounts lost their land to the crusaders most notably Simon de Montfort, 5th Earl of Leicester, some gained their lands back, others did not.

The Duchy of Brittany was perhaps the feudal state with the most independence from France in the 13th century and it had several viscounts.

Duchy of Aquataine/King of England had several viscounts under his control in the 13th century. Many of the viscounties were dependent on the king of England's diplomacy with the ruling family of the given viscounty. In Particular Bearn (and Brulhois) was almost an independent state which preferred to honor its de jure vassalage to England (as the duke of Aquataine) rather than to the King of France who would be a far more imposing overlord due to his proximity. As such Bearn was not always 100% cooperative.

The Count of Champagne had viscounts in his county (which was quite independent of France, but whose interests were generally the same in the 13th century).

The Duchy of Burgundy was a semi independent state which had viscounts. In 1233 William de Champlitte sent a letter to the King of England giving credence for William de Monieriis, possibly acting on behalf of the Duke of Burgundy. 

The Counts of Provence who were part of the Holy Roman Empire (and had not fealty at all to the kingdom of France) had at least one viscount.

The Counts of Rodez who were also viscounts of Carlat had a vassal viscount the viscount of Murat

Great Lords/Princes/Barons

Lords 

Pays de la Loire

Centre Val de Loire

Bourgogne Franche-Comte

Normandy

Provence Alpes-Cote d'Azur

Auvergne-Rhone-Alps

Knights of France 
Geoffrey of Villehardouin

Guerin, Hospitallier Knight, Bishop, Chancellor of France

Etienne de Longchamps

References

Lists of French nobility
Medieval French nobility